The River class is a class of offshore patrol vessels built primarily for the Royal Navy of the United Kingdom. A total of nine were built for the Royal Navy (RN), four Batch 1 and five Batch 2. One Batch 1, which was the Falklands guard ship, was decommissioned and transferred at the end of its lease to the Royal Bahrain Naval Force.

The three remaining Batch 1 ships perform fisheries security and border patrol tasks in UK waters. The five new Batch 2 ships provide overseas forward presence, performing maritime security duties and disaster relief operations, often supported by a Royal Fleet Auxiliary vessel.

 was the first of two ships adapting the River design for the Royal Thai Navy and built in Thailand.

Royal Navy

Batch 1

Tyne, Severn and Mersey

In early 2001, the Ministry of Defence placed an order with Vosper Thornycroft (VT) for three River-class offshore patrol vessels to replace the Island class. It was understood that the higher availability rates of the River class (up to 300 days per year) would enable the three new ships to perform the duties of the five ships they replaced. The Royal Navy initially leased the ships from VT under a five-year, £60 million contract. As part of the contract, VT would be responsible for all maintenance and support during the charter period. This contract was renewed in January 2007 for another five years at £52 million. However, in September 2012, instead of renewing the contract again, it was announced by the then Defence Secretary Philip Hammond that the Ministry of Defence had purchased the vessels for £39 million.

The River class are significantly larger than the Island-class vessels and have a large open deck aft allowing them to be fitted with equipment for a specific role, which can include fire-fighting, disaster relief and anti-pollution work. For this purpose, a  capacity crane is fitted. In addition, the deck is strong enough for the transport of various tracked and wheeled light vehicles, or an LCVP. The class are primarily used with the Fishery Protection Squadron and EEZ patrol. In 2009, the average running costs for the River class were reported in Parliament at an estimated £20 million: "These figures, based on the expenditure incurred by the Ministry of Defence in 2009–10, include maintenance, safety certification, military upgrades, manpower, inventory, satellite communication, fuel costs and depreciation."

On 24 April 2017, in a written answer to a question raised by Sir Nicholas Soames, Parliamentary Under-Secretary for Defence Harriett Baldwin stated Severn would be decommissioned in 2017, with Mersey and Clyde following in 2019. Severn was decommissioned in a ceremony at Portsmouth on 27 October 2017, with Tyne due to follow in May 2018; however, the latter was brought back into service due to defects with Forth.

In March 2018, Baldwin's successor as Parliamentary Under-Secretary for Defence, Guto Bebb, announced that £12.7m had been allocated from the "EU Exit Preparedness Fund" to maintain the three Batch 1 ships to control and enforce UK waters and fisheries following the United Kingdom's withdrawal from the European Union. On 22 November 2018, the Defence Secretary, Gavin Williamson, formally announced that the first three Batch 1 River-class ships would be retained in service.

HMS Tyne, Mersey and Severn are now part of the Offshore Division of the Coastal Forces Squadron (the renamed 1st Patrol Boat Squadron).

Clyde

In February 2005, the Ministry of Defence placed an order with VT for the charter of a fourth modified River-class offshore patrol vessel. This fourth ship, was constructed at Portsmouth Dockyard and replaced the two s for duties around the South Atlantic and the Falkland Islands. Clydes elongated hull permits a  strengthened flight deck able to accommodate an AgustaWestland AW101 Merlin-sized helicopter. The ship has a full load displacement between 1,850 and 2,000 tonnes. Clyde was capable of temporarily embarking up to 110 troops and their equipment and inserting them anywhere on the Falkland Islands. Clyde had a complement of 36. Clyde was decommissioned on 20 December 2019.

Clyde was not owned by the Royal Navy, but had instead been leased via a PFI public–private partnership deal with BAE Systems. While the other three were purchased outright by the M.O.D, on 7 August 2020 it was announced in a ceremony held at the HMNB Portsmouth Naval Base that Clyde had been transferred to the Royal Bahrain Naval Force, with the ship renamed as Al-Zubara.

Batch 2

Forth, Medway, Trent

On 6 November 2013 it was announced that the British Government had signed an Agreement in Principle to build three new offshore patrol vessels, based on the River-class design, at a fixed price of £348 million including spares and support for the Royal Navy. In August 2014, BAE Systems signed the contract to build the ships at their BAE Systems Maritime – Naval Ships shipyards in Glasgow on the River Clyde. The Ministry of Defence stated that the Batch 2 ships are capable of being used for constabulary duties such as "counter-terrorism, counter-piracy and anti-smuggling operations". According to BAE Systems, the vessels are designed to be deployed globally, conducting anti-piracy, counter-terrorism and anti-smuggling tasks currently conducted by frigates and destroyers. Steel was cut on 10 October 2014 and the class started entering service from 2017, with the last being delivered in August 2020. The ships are built at the BAE Systems Govan shipyard, then transferred to the BAE Systems Scotstoun shipyard for fitting out.

The Batch 2 ships are fundamentally different in appearance and capabilities from the preceding Batch 1. The Batch 2 ships also have a different (full width) superstructure, and a fundamentally different above-water hullform shape (greater bow flare, different and less-pronounced forward knuckle line compared to the Batch 1 ships, lack of the distinctive forward and aft bulwarks of the Batch 1 vessels). The class is also fitted with the Kelvin Hughes SharpEye integrated radar system for navigation, the Terma Scanter 4100 2D radar for air and surface surveillance, and a BAE CMS-1 "Combat Management System".

Batch 2 are also the first Royal Navy ships fitted with the BAE Systems Shared Infrastructure operating system. BAE describes Shared Infrastructure as "a state-of-the-art system that will revolutionise the way ships operate by using virtual technologies to host and integrate the sensors, weapons and management systems that complex warships require. Replacing multiple large consoles dedicated to specific tasks with a single hardware solution reduces the number of spares required to be carried onboard and will significantly decrease through-life costs."

The class has been criticised in evidence to the Commons Defence Select Committee: lacking a helicopter hangar, something that will limit usefulness of the helicopter deck by preventing embarkation of a helicopter for anything other than very short periods; lacking a medium calibre gun (such as 76 mm); and poor value for money. It is argued that because of the lack of these features - which could have been incorporated for the price - the vessels will not be as capable in the ocean-going patrol capacity as claimed. A criticism of the class is that the reasoning behind their commissioning was simply to ensure that public money continued to support BAE dockyards and jobs prior to the ordering of the Type 26 frigate.

The Batch 2 ships for the Royal Navy include some 29 modifications and enhancements over the  built by BAE Systems for the Brazilian Navy. The Royal Navy ships are built to more stringent naval standards, with features such as magazine protection, improved hull integrity and fire safety modifications, as well as greater redundancy.

The first, HMS Forth, was christened at a ceremony at the BAE Systems Scotstoun shipyard in Glasgow on 9 March 2017. Forth replaced HMS Clyde as the Falkland Islands guardship in December 2019.

All Batch 2 ships will fulfil forward presence tasks, permanently stationed overseas with rotating crews, releasing the Type 23 frigates which previously filled the roles for other duties. HMS Medway was commissioned in September 2019 and in January 2020 deployed as the long-term Atlantic Patrol Task (North) ship in the Caribbean.

HMS Trent was commissioned in August 2020 and immediately deployed to the Mediterranean on anti-people smuggling tasks. The 2021 defence white paper announced that she would henceforth be permanently based in Gibraltar for operations in the Mediterranean and in the Gulf of Guinea.

Tamar and Spey

The Strategic Defence and Security Review 2015 announced a further purchase of two more Batch 2 ships at an undisclosed date in the future. Expectations at the time were that this would encompass the three Batch 2 ships announced in 2013, the two additional Batch 2 ships announced in the 2015 defence review, and the modified Batch 1 ship, Clyde. The three Batch 1 ships without flight decks would be withdrawn in favour of the newer ships. The defence review suggested that the ships could be used to increase the Royal Navy's ability to defend UK interests at home and abroad.

The First Sea Lord also elaborated on the potential uses for the Batch 2 ships overseas, including the possibility of basing an extra ship at the Falklands Islands, or forward basing it elsewhere.

A £287m order for the two new ships, and support for all five Batch 2 ships, was announced on 8 December 2016. HM Ships Tamar and Spey would join the fleet in 2020 and 2021 respectively, both fulfilling overseas Forward Presence roles and releasing Type 23 frigates for roles more suited to a higher-capability warship.

On 21 April 2017, with construction of HMS Tamar already under way, the first steel was cut for HMS Spey. Like their predecessors, the ships were constructed at the BAE Systems Govan shipyard, then transferred to the Scotstoun shipyard for fitting out.

Tamar arrived at her home port of Portsmouth for the first time on 2 April 2020, joining HMS Trent. She would spend the rest of the year training before commissioning and deploying. HMS Spey began contractor sea trials in September 2020, arriving in her home port of Portsmouth for the first time on 30 October 2020. HMS Spey was commissioned into the Royal Navy in Portsmouth on 18 June 2021.

According to Forbes, in an emergency the Royal Navy might have to attach anti-ship missiles to its Batch 2 River-class patrol ships to make up for its lack of surface warfare frigates and destroyers, and additional upgrades could include attaching a Bofors 57 mm gun. However, no such weapons fit had yet been authorised for the River-class ships.

On 7 September 2021 both HMS Spey and HMS Tamar left Portsmouth to be forward deployed to the Indo-Pacific region. It is anticipated that they will not return for a minimum of 5 years and could stay in the region for up to 10 years.

Foreign orders

Brazilian Navy

Three vessels of the  based on the River class were built by BAE in the United Kingdom. They were originally intended to be exported for use by the Trinidad and Tobago Defence Force; however, the Government of the Republic of Trinidad and Tobago cancelled the order in September 2010. In December 2011 it was reported that the Brazilian Navy were interested in buying the vessels, and possibly up to five additional vessels of the same design. The sale, for £133 million (compared to an original £150m), was then confirmed on 2 January 2012.

Royal Thai Navy

 was the first modified River-class vessel built for the Royal Thai Navy. The ship was built in Thailand but with design, technology transfer and support provided by BAE Systems. In January 2016 it was announced that a contract had been signed to provide the Royal Thai Navy with a second ship based on the River-class OPV to be built under licence at Bangkok Dock Company. This second Thai-built ship,  was launched in August 2019 fitted with four RGM-84 Harpoon anti-ship missiles not present on Krabi. The new vessel was commissioned less than two months later.

List of vessels

See also
 List of naval ship classes in service
  – a related 99-metre corvette class also designed by BAE Systems

Notes

References

External links

 
Patrol ship classes
Patrol vessels of the United Kingdom
Ship classes of the Royal Navy